is a district of Shibuya, Tokyo, Japan.

As of October 2020, the population of this district is 16,763. The postal code for Sasazuka is 151-0073.

Geography
Sasazuka borders Minamidai in the north, Hatagaya to the east, Shimokitazawa to the south, Ōhara in the southwest, and Hōnan to the north and west.

Demography

Education
 operates public elementary and junior high schools.

Sasazuka 1-2 chome, and 3-chome 1-39 and 56-64 ban are zoned to Sasazuka Elementary School (笹塚小学校). Sasazuka 3chome 40-55-ban are zoned to Nakahata Elementary School (中幡小学校).  All of Sasazuka (1-3 chome) is zoned to Sasazuka Junior High School (笹塚中学校).

Schools in Sasazuka:
 Sasazuka Elementary School (渋谷区立笹塚小学校)
 Sasazuka Junior High School (渋谷区立笹塚中学校) 
  (富士見丘中学校・高等学校) - Private school

Gallery

References

Neighborhoods of Tokyo
Shibuya